Germaine Kouméalo Anaté (born June 15, 1968 in Kazaboua, in Sotouboua Prefecture) is a Togolese government minister, scholar and writer. On 17 September 2013 she was appointed Minister of Communication, Culture, Arts and Civic Education in the government of Kwesi Ahoomey-Zunu1. She held the position of Chief of Staff of the Ministry of Higher Education and Research of Togo before being promoted to minister. The holder of a doctorate in Information Science and Communication at the University of Bordeaux III in France, she is a lecturer and research professor in this field at the universities of Lomé and Kara. Anaté' is the President of the Writers' Association of Togo (AET) and is author of several books.

References

1968 births
Living people
Government ministers of Togo
University of Bordeaux alumni
Women government ministers of Togo
20th-century Togolese women writers
20th-century Togolese writers
21st-century Togolese women writers
21st-century Togolese writers
21st-century Togolese women politicians
21st-century Togolese politicians